For Cause and Comrades: Why Men Fought in the Civil War is a book by the Pulitzer Prize–winning author James M. McPherson. The book was published by Oxford University Press in 1997 and covers the lives and ideals of American Civil War soldiers from both sides of the war. Drawing from a compilation of over 25,000 letters and 250 personal diaries, For Cause and Comrades tells the story of the American Civil War's soldiers through their own uncensored point of view.

Overview

Confederate motivations
In the book, McPherson contrasts the views of the Confederates regarding slavery to that of the colonial-era American revolutionaries of the late 18th century. He stated that while the American colonists of the 1770s saw an incongruity with slave ownership and proclaiming to be fighting for liberty, the Confederates did not, as the Confederacy's overriding ideology of white supremacy negated any contradiction between the two:

McPherson states that the Confederates did not discuss the issue of slavery as often as Union soldiers did, because most Confederate soldiers readily accepted as an obvious fact that they were fighting to perpetuate slavery, and thus did not feel a need to debate over it:

Continuing, McPherson also stated that of the hundreds of Confederate soldiers' letters he read, none of them contained any anti-slavery sentiment whatsoever:

However, McPherson notes that in his sampling of letters, Confederates from slave-owning families were over-represented.

Union motivations
McPherson also examined the motivations behind Union soldiers and what drove them to fight for the United States in the war. He stated that although Union soldiers primarily fought to preserve the United States as a country, they fought to end slavery as well, stating that:

Reception
Reaction to the book was highly positive. According to the School Library Journal Review, "This powerful commentary by today's premier Civil War historian is truly compelling in its depth and intensity." 

The School Library Journal Review also gave a favorable review, saying "McPherson uses these letters well: they not only support his arguments but provide the intensely human elements of fear, sickness, loneliness and exhaustion that make the question of motivations so poignant." 

The Choice Review lauded the book as well, saying "McPherson offers a persuasive and provocative account of why Civil War soldiers fought."

Awards
For Cause and Comrades: Why Men Fought in the Civil War won the Lincoln Prize in 1998.

See also

Battle Cry of Freedom

References

External links

Presentation by McPherson on For Cause and Comrades, May 21, 1998

1997 non-fiction books
American history books
History books about the American Civil War
Oxford University Press books